This is a complete list of Marines from the 3rd Battalion 3rd Marine Regiment who have been awarded any of the United States's three highest military decorations for valor in combatthe  Medal of Honor, the Navy Cross, or the Silver Star.  A after a recipient's name indicates that the award was given posthumously.

World War II
Eight Marines from 3rd Battalion were awarded the Medal of Honor (1) or the Navy Cross (7) during World War II; six of these medals (Navy Crosses) were for actions during the Battle of Bougainville and the other two (the Medal of Honor and one Navy Cross) were for actions during the Battle of Guam.

Medal of Honor

Private Luther Skaggs, Jr. received the Medal of Honor for his heroic actions on the beachhead on Guam during World War II. After the section leader became a casualty, Skaggs took over command and led the section through heavy enemy fire. Although wounded by a Japanese grenade that shattered the lower part of his leg, he continued to defend for a further eight hours through the night.

Navy Cross
James Beck
Rank and billet: Private, Rifleman
Organization: Company K
Date and place of action: 1943-11-22, Piva Forks, Bougainville
Entered service: Unknown
Birth: Unknown

Ralph Houser
Rank and billet: Lieutenant Colonel, Battalion Commander
Organization: H&S Company
Date and place of action: 1944-07-21 - 1944-07-23, Asan-Adelup Beachead, Guam
Entered service: 1935, Quantico, Virginia
Birth: 1914, Iowa City, Iowa
Death: 2001, Reston, Virginia

John Logan, Jr.
Rank and billet: Corporal, Squad Leader
Organization: Company L
Date and place of action: 1943-11-24, Piva Forks, Bougainville
Entered service: Pittsburgh, Pennsylvania
Birth: Washington, D.C.
Death: 1943, Bougainville

Vernon Miller
Rank and billet: 1st Lieutenant, Platoon Commander
Organization: Machine Gun Platoon, Company K
Date and place of action: 1944-07-21 - 1944-07-23, Asan-Adelup Beachead, Guam
Entered service: 
Birth: 
Death:

Paul Torian
Rank and billet: Captain, Company Commander
Organization: Company K
Date and place of action: 1943-11-24, Piva Forks, Bougainville
Entered service: Evansville, Indiana
Birth: 1920, Evansville, Indiana
Death: 2004

Robert Turnbull
Rank and billet: Captain, Company Commander
Organization: Company L
Date and place of action: 1943-11-24, Piva Forks, Bougainville
Entered service: Lawrenceville, Virginia
Birth: Lawrenceville, Virginia
Death: 1943, Bougainville

James Luther Lee Jnr
Citation: Bureau of Naval Personnel Information Bulletin No. 328 (July 1944)
Rank:  Pharmacist's Mate Third Class
Company: Corpsman
Date and place of action: 1943-11-21, Piva Forks, Bougainville
Entered service: Austin, Texas
Born: September 8, 1924 at Fiskville, Texas
Home Town: Round Rock, Texas
Death: Killed in Action 1943-11-21, Piva Forks, Bougainville

Vietnam War

Medal of Honor

Ronald L. Coker
Rank and billet: Private First Class, Rifleman
Organization: Company M
Date and place of action: 1969-03-24, Quang Tri Province, Republic of Vietnam
Entered service: 1968-04-16, Denver, Colorado
Birth: 1947-08-09, Alliance, Nebraska
Death: 1969-03-24, Quang Tri Province

Robert O'Malley
Rank and billet: Corporal, Squad Leader
Organization: Company I
Date and place of action: 1965-08-18, Operation Starlite, Republic of Vietnam
Entered service: 1961-10-11, New York, NY
Birth: 1943-06-03, New York, NY
Death: N/A

William Prom
Rank and billet: Lance Corporal, Machine Gunner
Organization: Machine Gun Section, Company I
Date and place of action: 1969-02-09, Near An Hoa, Republic of Vietnam
Entered service: 1967-12-27, Pittsburgh, Pennsylvania
Birth: 1948-11-17, Pittsburgh, Pennsylvania
Death: 1969-02-09, Near An Hoa

Navy Cross

Joseph Muir
Rank and billet: Lieutenant Colonel, Battalion Commander
Organization: H&S Company
Date and place of action: 1965-08-18 to 1965-08-24, Operation Starlite, Republic of Vietnam
Entered service: Unknown
Birth: 1948-06-08, New York, NY
Death: 1965-09-11, Da Nang, Republic of Vietnam

Bruce Webb
Rank and billet: Captain, Company Commander
Organization: Company I
Date and place of action: 1965-08-18, Operation Starlite, Republic of Vietnam
Entered service: Unknown
Birth: 1933-11-10, Wheaton, IL
Death: 1965-08-18, Republic of Vietnam

James Mulloy
Rank and billet: Sergeant, Supply NCO
Organization: H&S Company
Date and place of action: 1965-08-18, Operation Starlite, Republic of Vietnam
Entered service: Unknown
Birth: Unknown
Death:

Robert Moe
Rank and billet: Staff Sergeant, Platoon Commander
Organization: Company L, 3rd Platoon
Date and place of action: 1965-12-09, Quang Tin Province, Republic of Vietnam
Entered service: Unknown
Birth: Unknown
Death:

Grover Dickson
Rank and billet: Corporal, Squad Leader
Organization: Company K, 2nd Platoon
Date and place of action: 1966-11-11, Operation Prairie, Republic of Vietnam
Entered service: New Orleans, LA
Birth: 1938-03-15, Fort Worth, TX
Death: 1966-11-11, Republic of Vietnam

James Kelly
Rank and billet: Corporal, Grenadier
Organization: Company I
Date and place of action: 1967-03-24, An Hoa, Republic of Vietnam
Entered service: Sacramento, CA
Birth: 1945-03-12
Death: 1967-03-24, Republic of Vietnam

Louis Pichon
Rank and billet: Gunnery Sergeant, Company Gunnery Sergeant
Organization: Company I
Date and place of action: 1967-03-24, Cam Lo, Republic of Vietnam
Entered service: Slidell, LA
Birth: Unknown
Death: 1967-03-24, Republic of Vietnam

Robert Schley
Rank and billet: Corporal, Machine Gun Team Leader
Organization: Company M
Date and place of action: 1967-04-30, Battle of Hill 881, Republic of Vietnam
Entered service: Unknown
Birth: 1944-01-21, Oregon, WI
Death: 1967-04-30, Republic of Vietnam

Terrance Meier
Rank and billet: Staff Sergeant, Platoon Sergeant
Organization: Company M, 2nd Platoon
Date and place of action: 1967-07-21, Ca Lu, Republic of Vietnam
Entered service: Portland, OR
Birth: Unknown
Death: 1967-07-21, Republic of Vietnam

Robert Lee Quick
Rank and billet: Private First Class, Rifleman
Organization: Company K
Date and place of action: 1968-02-07, Gio Linh, Republic of Vietnam
Entered service: Wallaceton, PA
Birth: Unknown
Death: 1968-02-07, Republic of Vietnam

Edward Day
Rank and billet: Lance Corporal, Squad Leader
Organization: Company L
Date and place of action: 1968-08-26, The Rockpile, Republic of Vietnam
Entered service: Philadelphia, PA
Birth: 1949-07-12
Death: 1968-08-26, Republic of Vietnam

Vernon Yarber
Rank and billet: Lance Corporal, Squad Leader
Organization: Company L
Date and place of action: 1968-08-26, The Rockpile, Republic of Vietnam
Entered service: Jacksonville, FL
Birth: 
Death: 1968-08-26, Republic of Vietnam

Robert Dalton
Rank and billet: Corporal, Squad Leader
Organization: Company K
Date and place of action: 1969-05-25, Vietnamese Demilitarized Zone, Republic of Vietnam
Entered service: Unknown
Birth: Unknown 
Death:

Roger Rosenberger
Rank and billet: Private First Class, Rifleman
Organization: Company M
Date and place of action: 1969-06-17, Dong Ha, Republic of Vietnam
Entered service: Swartz Creek, MI
Birth: 1950-07-29
Death: 1969-06-17, Republic of Vietnam

James McWhorter
Rank and billet: Lance Corporal, Squad Leader
Organization: Company L, 3rd Platoon
Date and place of action: 1969-08-22, Quang Tri Province, Republic of Vietnam
Entered service: Beaverton, OR
Birth: Unknown
Death: 1969-08-22, Republic of Vietnam

Terrence Kierznowski
Rank and billet: Hospital Corpsman Second Class
Organization: US Navy, attached to Company K
Date and place of action: 1969-09-12, Quang Tri Province, Republic of Vietnam
Entered service: Crete, IL
Birth: Unknown
Death: 1969-09-12, Republic of Vietnam

Silver Star
Lance Corporal David W. Cutshall: "For conspicuous gallantry and intrepidity in action while serving as a Machine Gun Team Leader with Company M, Third Battalion, Third Marines, Third Marine Division. On 6 March 1968, during a company-size operation near Con Thien, Lance Corporal Cutshall's platoon came under intense enemy automatic weapons, mortar and artillery fire from a well entrenched battalion of North Vietnamese Army Regulars. Observing enemy movement through the brush, he marked the area with machine gun tracer rounds which enabled an anti-tank assault team to destroy an enemy bunker with rocket fire. Throughout the five-hour fire fight, he maintained a critical position and directed highly effective machine gun fire upon the enemy. Ordered to withdraw to a more advantageous position, he provided covering fire for his companions as they moved to join their platoon. While preparing to throw a hand grenade, Lance Corporal Cutshall was severely wounded by enemy grenade fragments which caused him to drop his grenade. Without regard for his own safety, he immediately fell upon the activated grenade to shield his companions. Although he was killed when it exploded, he undoubtedly saved the lives of his three companions. By his extraordinary courage, bold initiative and selfless devotion to duty, Lance Corporal Cutshall upheld the highest traditions of the United States Naval Service."

Lance Corporal Dennis Scalici, a fire team leader with Lima Company, received two Silver Stars within a four-month period.

Lance Corporal Timothy Gene Carter, Mortar Team Leader, was awarded the Silver Star along with 6 other medals posthumously (1969). Carter was the highest decorated Marine from Nevada of the Vietnam War. A mortar range in Hawthorne, Nevada, bears his name.

Sergeant Laurence Eugene Belko, with India Company, was awarded a Silver Star in May 1968 for coordinating a five-hour rescue of his comrades in Dong Ha, while wounded and under enemy fire.

Afghan War

Medal of Honor
, only one Marine from Third Battalion has been awarded the Medal of Honor for actions in the Afghanistan.

Dakota Meyer
Rank and billet: Corporal
Organization: Embedded Training Team 2-8
Date and place of action: 2008-09-08,  Kunar province, Afghanistan
Entered service: Greensburg, Kentucky
Birth: Greensburg, Kentucky

Silver Star
, only one Marine from Third Battalion has been awarded the Silver Star for actions in Afghanistan.

Stephen Boada
Rank and billet: 1st Lieutenant, Forward Air Controller
Organization: Company K, 2nd Platoon
Date and place of action: 2005-05-05 - 2005-05-09, Shatagal Village, Afghanistan
Entered service: Bristol, Connecticut
Birth: Bristol, Connecticut

Statistics
Parentheses indicate number of times award was posthumous.

References

External links 
 
 Top 3 are: Medal of Honor; Navy Cross / Distinguished Service Cross / Air Force Cross; Silver Star
 this US DOD source only reports US Navy and US Marine Corps recipients of the Navy Cross
 
 this long standing private source believes it is "99.9% complete" for all military, civilian and allied recipients of the Top 2 (above Silver Star)
 
 

United States Marine Corps lists
Recipients of United States military awards and decorations
Lists of American military personnel